Silvio Heinevetter (born 21 October 1984) is a German handballer for TVB 1898 Stuttgart and the German national team.

He participated at the 2019 World Men's Handball Championship.

Achievements
Summer Olympics:
: 2016

References

External links

1984 births
Living people
German male handball players
People from Bad Langensalza
Olympic handball players of Germany
Handball players at the 2016 Summer Olympics
Medalists at the 2016 Summer Olympics
Olympic bronze medalists for Germany
Olympic medalists in handball
Handball-Bundesliga players
Füchse Berlin Reinickendorf HBC players
Sportspeople from Thuringia
SC Magdeburg players